The Midland Bridge Company is a firm based in Kansas City, Missouri, United States, that has built numerous bridges.  Several of its works are listed on the U.S. National Register of Historic Places (NRHP).

Works of the firm include:
 Dewey Bridge, built 1916, NE of Moab, Utah, carried Utah State Route 128 across the Colorado River. When completed, it was the second-longest suspension bridge west of the Mississippi River.  Destroyed by fire in 2008, but still listed on the NRHP.
 Cameron Suspension Bridge, Cameron, Arizona, carries U.S. Route 89 across Little Colorado River, longest suspension bridge west of the Mississippi at the time of construction.
 Allentown Bridge, Indian Rt. 9402 over the Puerco River, milepost 9.1 Houck, Arizona, NRHP-listed
 Caddo Lake Bridge, LA 538, over Caddo Lake, Mooringsport, Louisiana, NRHP-listed
 Delaware River Parker Truss Bridge, Bridge St., 0.3 mi. W of int. with Main St. Perry, Kansas, NRHP-listed
 EJE Bridge over Shell Creek, Cty. Rd. CN9-57, Shell, Wyoming, NRHP-listed
 Green Bridge, 4100 Dripping Springs Rd., Las Cruces, New Mexico, NRHP-listed
 Hereford Bridge, Hereford Rd. over the San Pedro River, Hereford, Arizona, NRHP-listed
 Hurricane-LaVerkin Bridge, East of Utah State Route 9 over the Virgin River Hurricane, Utah, NRHP-listed
 Long Shoals Bridge, over Little Osage River, east of Fulton, Kansas, NRHP-listed
 Park Avenue Bridge, Park Ave. over the San Francisco River, Clifton, Arizona, NRHP-listed

References

Bridge companies
Construction and civil engineering companies of the United States